Lexington High School can refer to more than one educational institution in the United States:

Lexington High School (Illinois) — Lexington, Illinois
Lexington High School (Massachusetts) — Lexington, Massachusetts
Lexington High School (Missouri) — Lexington, Missouri part of Lexington R-V School District
Lexington Senior High School (Nebraska)
Lexington Senior High School (North Carolina) — Lexington, North Carolina
Lexington High School (Ohio) — Lexington, Ohio
Lexington High School (South Carolina) — Lexington, South Carolina
Lexington High School (Tennessee) — Lexington, Tennessee
Lexington High School (Texas) — Lexington, Texas